The 2016 Challenge Cup, (also known as the Ladbrokes Challenge Cup for sponsorship reasons) was the 115th staging of the Challenge Cup the main rugby league knockout tournament for teams in the Super League, the British National Leagues and a number of invited amateur clubs.

The cup was won by Hull F.C. who beat Warrington Wolves 12–10 in the final at Wembley Stadium on 27 August 2016.

The defending champions, Leeds Rhinos who were looking to win the trophy three times in a row were defeated by Huddersfield Giants in the sixth round.

The format of the competition is eight knock-out rounds followed by a final. The first two rounds are composed entirely of amateur teams. The nine winners of the second round ties are joined in round 3 by the 15 Championship 1 teams. For the fourth round the 12 Championship teams are included in the draw. Starting in 2015 and continuing for the 2016 competition round 5 sees four Super League teams entering the competition. These are the four teams that finished in the bottom four positions of the 2015 Super League and are; Widnes Vikings, Hull Kingston Rovers, Salford Red Devils, and Wakefield Trinity Wildcats. These are the same four teams that joined at this stage in the 2015 competition. The remaining eight Super League teams join in round 6.

First round
The draw for the first round of the 2016 Challenge Cup was held on 7 January 2016 at Wembley Stadium and featured 36 amateur teams from around the United Kingdom including two student teams, all three armed services and the police. Home teams were drawn by Tom Briscoe and the away teams drawn by Lizzie Jones.

Fixtures for the first round were played over the weekend of the 30–31 January 2016.

Second round
The draw for the second round was held at RAF Coningsby on 2 February 2016 and the teams were drawn by Sheffield Eagles coach Mark Aston and Batley Bulldogs coach John Kear.

Ties were played on 13 February.

Third round
The third round draw was held on 16 February at North Wales Crusaders ground, the Glyndwr University Racecourse Stadium, Wrexham. The draw was made by Paul Rowley and Lee Briers. The 12 ties were played over the last weekend of February.

Fourth round
The draw for the fourth round was made on 1 March at the White Lion pub in Swinton. The draw was made by retired players Adrian Morley and Paul Wellens.  The 24 teams in the draw comprise the 7 Championship 1 teams and 5 National Conference League teams who won through from the third round and the 12 teams of the Championship.

Ties were played over the weekend of 18–20 March.

Fifth round
The fifth round draw was made on Tuesday 22 March.  This round sees the first entry of Super League clubs when the teams that finished 9th – 12th in the 2015 season are in the draw.  The draw was made by Sam Tomkins and Chris Hill (Hill was a late replacement for Sean Long).  Ties were played over the weekend of 15–17 April.

The tie between Batley and Featherstone was shown live on Sky Sports 5.

Sixth round
The draw for the sixth round was made on 21 April 2016 live on BBC Radio 4 Today programme. The teams were drawn by Today presenter John Humphrys and former England and Great Britain international player Martin Offiah.  Ties were played over 6–8 May 2016.

Sky televised the Batley v Catalans game on Friday 6 May. The BBC broadcast Castleford v Salford on Saturday 7 May and St Helens v Hull on Sunday 8 May.

Quarter finals
The quarter final draw was made after the conclusion of the St Helens vs Hull game, live on BBC 2. The home teams were drawn by Linzi Prescott (widows of Steve Prescott) and the away teams by Tommy Martyn. Ties will be played over the weekend of 23–25 June.

All four matches were broadcast live. The games at Huddersfield and Hull were shown on Sky Sports and the other two games by BBC Sport.

Semi finals
The semi-final draw was made immediately after the Wigan v Castleford quarter final game. The draw was made by Castleford and Leigh player Bob Beardmore and Ian Gildart who played for Wigan, Wakefield Trinity and Oldham.

Final

The final was played at Wembley Stadium on Saturday 27 August 2016. Hull were seeking a first ever Challenge Cup victory at Wembley while Warrington were looking for their first win since 2012.

In a close fought game Hull came from 10–0 down with only 20 minutes left to play to win 12–10.  Hull , Marc Sneyd was voted the winner of the Lance Todd Trophy.

Teams:

Hull: Jamie Shaul, Stevie Michaels, Mahe Fonua, Kirk Yeaman, Fetuli Talanoa, Carlos Tuimavave, Marc Sneyd, Scott Taylor, Danny Houghton, Liam Watts, Sika Manu, Mark Minichiello, Gareth Ellis (captain).  Substitutes (all used): Josh Bowden, Frank Pritchard, Danny Washbrook, Chris Green.
Tries: Fonua (1), Shaul (1). Goals: Sneyd (2/2).

Warrington Wolves: Stefan Ratchford, Matty Russell, Toby King, Ryan Atkins, Rhys Evans, Kurt Gidley, Chris Sandow, Chris Hill (captain), Daryl Clark, Ashton Sims, Ben Currie, Jack Hughes, Joe Westerman. Substitutes (all used): George King, Brad Dwyer, Ben Westwood, Ryan Bailey.
Tries: Russell (1), Currie (1). Goals: Gidley (1/3).

References

Notes

Challenge Cup
2016 in rugby league
2016 in English rugby league
2016 in Welsh rugby league
2016 in French rugby league
2016 in Scottish sport